The 1991–1992 South Ossetia War (also known as the First South Ossetia War) was fought between Georgian government forces and ethnic Georgian militia on one side and the forces of South Ossetia and North Ossetian volunteers who wanted South Ossetia to secede from Georgia and become an independent state on the other. The war ended with a Russian-brokered ceasefire, signed on 24 June 1992, which established a joint peacekeeping force and left South Ossetia divided between the rival authorities.

Background
Following the breakdown of the Tsarist regime in Russia, South Ossetians allied with the Russian Bolsheviks, fighting a war against the newly independent Menshevik Georgia. Initially Georgia was successful, but in 1921, the Red Army conquered the country. South Ossetia became an autonomous oblast in the Georgian Soviet Socialist Republic. During the Soviet period, relations between ethnic Ossetians and Georgians were peaceful, with a high rate of interaction and intermarriages.

In 1989, around 98,000 people lived in South Ossetia. Of these, 66.61% were Ossetian and 29.44% Georgian. Another 99,000 Ossetians lived throughout the rest of Georgia.

At the end of 1991, with the collapse of the Soviet Union, Georgia became an independent country again under the leadership of Zviad Gamsakhurdia. While his agenda was mainly directed at Soviet policies, his actions were often also at the expense of minority groups within Georgia. At the same time, South Ossetians organised as well and expressed national aspirations: the Supreme Soviet of South Ossetia demanded a change of status to an autonomous republic, a move declared illegal by the Supreme Soviet of Georgia. On 23 November 1989, Gamsakhurdia organised a demonstration of Georgians that was to occur in Tskhinvali, the capital of South Ossetia. South Ossetians prevented this by blocking the road. Violent clashes broke out resulting in several people being wounded. In the following months, the South Ossetians started arming themselves.

Gamsakhurdia won the 1990 election to the Georgian Supreme Council, which was boycotted by South Ossetians. In response, South Ossetians organised a vote for a South Ossetian parliament. Reacting to this, the Georgian Supreme Council voted to abolish the South Ossetian Autonomous Oblast as a separate administrative unit. Towards the end of 1990, the situation for ethnic Georgians in Tskhinvali worsened sharply. There were reports of multiple cases of lootings and beatings committed both by Georgian and Ossetian forces and paramilitaries. In December 1990, Tbilisi declared a state of emergency in South Ossetia and troops of the Georgian and Russian Interior Ministry (MVD) were dispatched to South Ossetia. The commander of the Georgian Interior Ministry troops was appointed as mayor of Tskhinvali. Georgia also imposed an economic blockade on South Ossetia. A military conflict was imminent.

Combatants
South Ossetian forces consisted of militia, volunteers from North Ossetia and other regions in North Caucasus. Most of their equipment and arms were former Soviet arms abandoned following the break-up of the Soviet Union. Former Georgian president, Eduard Shevardnadze, accused Russia of military involvement in the conflict. At the same time, the Ossetians claimed that Russian military and police failed to protect the local civilian population during Georgian attacks on Tskhinvali and surrounding Ossetian villages. The Georgian side claimed there was overt help from military units of the Russian Federation.

In early 1990, South Ossetia had only 300–400 poorly armed fighters. Within six months the South Ossetian force grew to 1,500 full-time fighters plus 3,500 volunteers. Georgia's forces were in much poorer shape. The ragtag Georgian forces composed of ethnic Georgians were not as well trained and equipped as their opponents. The Georgian National Guard that fought in the war was formed in January 1991, just before the fighting started. It was supposed to be a 12,000 strong force raised by conscription, but because of financial difficulties it had to be formed from volunteers instead.

Several informal Georgian militias also participated in the conflict, including White Eagles (splinter group of the National Guard), White George (rumored to be common criminals who were granted amnesty in order to fight in South Ossetia), Black Panthers, Kutaisi National Guard and Merab Kostava Society.

Gamsakhurdia's approach to South Ossetia was seen by the West as going against human rights, and his inability to maintain Georgia's territorial integrity discouraged foreign recognition. At the end of 1991, Georgia was the only ex-Soviet republic that had not been officially recognized by the majority of Western powers. However, such considerations did not prevent Romania from becoming the first country to recognize Georgia's independence in August 1991. In late 1991, Gamsakhurdia purchased from Romania 1,000 AK-47 rifles at an apparently discounted price, $150 each, when the typical price for a Kalashnikov rifle during 1990-1991 was in the $250 - $300 range.

War
On the night of 5 to 6 January 1991, the Georgian police force entered Tskhinvali to disarm the Ossetian armed groups. The fighting in Tskhinvali first resulted in a divided town: An Ossetian-controlled western part and a Georgian-controlled eastern part. Towards the end of January, the Georgians withdrew to the hills around the city according to the Russian-mediated ceasefire. However, the economic blockade of South Ossetia was kept in place.

The Georgians made three assaults on the Ossetian-held parts of Tskhinvali, in February and March 1991 and in June 1992. The most intense period of war was in March and April 1991. On 23 March 1991, the chairman of Russia's Supreme Soviet, Boris Yeltsin, met Gamsakhurdia in Kazbegi, northeast Georgia, and agreed to push for efforts to withdraw Soviet troops from South Ossetia and create a joint Georgian-Russian police force to restore peace in the region. On 24 March, a temporary ceasefire was agreed and Georgian forces largely withdrew from the city of Tskhinvali. After a period of relative calm in July and August, violence resumed in mid-September, when Gamsakhurdia ordered the Georgian National Guard once again to advance into South Ossetia. Only a few detachments followed the order to attack, and they were repelled by the South Ossetian militia. During the offensive in June, the Georgian National Guard burned and destroyed up to 80% percent of dwellings in Tskhinvali. Georgia imposed a blockade on South Ossetia by disconnecting electricity and blockading the road to Tskhinvali, while the Ossetians blockaded Georgian villages. Several atrocities occurred on both sides. The fighting left hundreds killed and wounded, with South Ossetian villages as well as Georgian houses and schools in Tskhinvali attacked and burned down. Georgian forces took up positions in the hills around Tskhinvali and besieged the city. Other fighting took place around the city in the nearby villages and along the road to North Ossetia.

In spring 1992 the fighting escalated again, with sporadic Russian involvement. However, in March 1992, Gamsakhurdia was ousted and replaced by Eduard Shevardnadze. Soon after, Gamsakhurdia loyalists staged an armed rebellion. Furthermore, the conflict with Georgia's other, bigger, separatist region Abkhazia, escalated into a war in 1992. As a result, Shevardnadze had an interest in ending the conflict in South Ossetia and signed the Russian-brokered Sochi agreement.

The ceasefire agreement left South Ossetia divided into areas controlled by Georgia and areas controlled by the unrecognised government of South Ossetia. It also created the Joint Control Commission (including Georgia, Russia, North Ossetia and South Ossetia) and, under JCC mandate, introduced the joint peacekeeping forces (JPKF), made up of Georgian, Russian and Ossetian soldiers. A small number of Organization for Security and Co-operation in Europe monitors was also deployed in the area.

The military action of the conflict was "confused and anarchic". Neither side had disciplined armed formations, and commanders and soldiers were often acting in their own interests. Military groups were controlled by political factions and not accountable to the respective governments. This led to the violation of ceasefires, taking of hostages and bombardment of civilian targets.

According to Human Rights Watch, during the war Georgian paramilitary groups committed acts of violence against Ossetian civilians within South Ossetia that were motivated by the desire to expel Ossetians and reclaim villages for Georgia, and by sheer revenge against the Ossetian people. Between 60 and 100 villages were burned down, destroyed by Georgian forces or otherwise abandoned. Several villages were ethnically cleansed by Georgian forces. On the other side, Georgians living in Ossetian controlled territory were "easy targets": Houses occupied by Georgians were singled out, looted and burned down.

During the war, approximately 1,000 people died. It also led to the creation of large numbers of refugees: more than 40,000 ethnic Ossetians fled from South Ossetia and Georgia proper, mainly into North Ossetia (part of Russia) and a further 23,000 ethnic Georgians fled from South Ossetia and settled in other Georgian areas. The flow of refugees into Northern Ossetia aggravated the tense ethnic situation there and played a significant role in the Ossetian–Ingush conflict.

See also
Georgian–Ossetian conflict
Russo-Georgian War

References

Conflicts in 1991
South Ossetia War
Conflicts in 1992
Georgian–Ossetian conflict
Wars involving Chechnya
Wars involving Georgia (country)
1990s in South Ossetia
Military of South Ossetia